StandFour is an American a cappella group from New York City made up of four former members of Yeshiva University's all-male a cappella group The Maccabeats. Formed in November 2012, the group is composed of four graduates of the university: David Block, Noey Jacobson, Nachum Joel, and Immanuel Shalev. StandFour is largely popular among the American Jewish community and the related blogosphere.

Their first song/video was released immediately after their formation, entitled "Eight Nights," and is a Hanukkah parody/mashup of three songs: "Some Nights" by Fun, "Die Young" by Ke$ha, and "Live While We're Young" by One Direction. , "Eight Nights" has been viewed over 1,627,265 times on YouTube.

References

External links 
 

Jewish musical groups
Professional a cappella groups
Musical groups established in 2012
Yeshiva University
2012 establishments in New York City